Sir Ethelbert Alfred Ransom  (19 March 1868 – 22 May 1943) was a New Zealand politician of the Liberal Party, then its successor the United Party, and from 1936, the National Party. He was a cabinet minister from 1928 to 1935 in the United Government, and was acting Prime Minister in 1930 and in 1935.

Early life
Ransom was born in 1868 in Lower Hutt. He received his education at Lower Hutt Primary, where he was school mate with Thomas Wilford. He played rugby and tennis during his youth. During the Second Boer War, he was an officer in charge of the Ruahine Mounted Rifles. He was a sheep farmer until 1888, and then a saddler in Dannevirke. From 1920 onwards, he was sheep farming in the Ākitio district.

He held numerous public offices: he was chairman of the Hawke's Bay War Relief Association, chairman of the Dannevirke branch of the same organisation, chairman of the power board (until 1928), the first president of the local chamber of commerce, chairman of the fire board, member of the Dannevirke High School board, member of the executive of the Farmers' Union, and represented on the Dannevirke A&P Association.

On 1 March 1893, Ransom married Antonette Katinka Sondergaard from Palmerston North at her home town. They lost an infant daughter and a son in 1902 and 1905, respectively.

Political career

Ransom was elected onto the Dannevirke Borough Council in 1901. He stood for Mayor of Dannevirke in 1903, but was beaten by the Lutheran pastor Hans Madsen Ries in a closely fought contest. Ransom was Mayor of Dannevirke from 1910, when he succeeded Ries, to 1919.

He represented the rural Wairarapa electorate of Pahiatua from 1922, when he defeated Reform's Archibald McNicol.

From 1926 to 1928, he was senior whip and deputy leader of the United Party for the North Island. During the time of the United Government, he was Minister of Public Works (1928–1930) under Joseph Ward, and Minister of Lands and Commissioner of State Forests (1930–1931) under George Forbes. He retained his portfolios until 1935 in the United–Reform Coalition. He was twice acting Prime Minister; in 1930, when Forbes attended the Imperial Conference in London, and again in 1935, when Forbes was overseas.

In 1940, he announced that he would not stand again at the next general election due to poor health, but he died in 1943 before the end of the parliamentary term.

Later life
In 1935, Ransom was awarded the King George V Silver Jubilee Medal, and he was appointed a Knight Commander of the Order of St Michael and St George in the 1935 King's Birthday Honours. He died on 22 May 1943 in Dannevirke, where he is also buried. At the funeral, senior whip Walter Broadfoot represented the National Party, and Prime Minister Peter Fraser represented the First Labour Government. Ransom was survived by his wife, a son and a daughter. His wife died in 1952.

Notes

References

New Zealand National Party MPs
Members of the Cabinet of New Zealand
New Zealand Liberal Party MPs
New Zealand Knights Commander of the Order of St Michael and St George
1868 births
1943 deaths
Mayors of places in Manawatū-Whanganui
United Party (New Zealand) MPs
New Zealand farmers
People from Lower Hutt
New Zealand military personnel of the Second Boer War
People from Dannevirke
Members of the New Zealand House of Representatives
New Zealand MPs for North Island electorates
New Zealand politicians awarded knighthoods